Gautam Buddha Nagar district is a district of Uttar Pradesh, named after Gautama Buddha. It is a part of Delhi NCR and is divided into 4 sub-divisions i.e. Noida, Greater Noida, Dadri and Jewar. Greater Noida is the administrative headquarters of Gautam Buddha Nagar district. Noida, Greater Noida, Dadri, Jewar and Dankaur fall under this district.

History
Gautam Buddha Nagar (GBN) district was formed on 6 September 1997 by carving out the portions of Ghaziabad district and Bulandshahr district. Dadri and Bisrakh blocks carved out of Ghaziabad, while Dankaur and Jewar blocks have been carved out of Bulandshahr. People from this land were actively associated with the Indian independence movement. Bhagat Singh, Rajguru, Sukhdev and Chandra Shekhar Azad used Nalgadha village (Sector-145, Noida) presently situated on the Noida-Greater Noida Expressway to hide during the freedom struggle. They planned 1929 bomb attack on the Central Legislative Assembly (presently known as Parliament House) from Nalgadha village.

The area occupied by this district has roots in Ramayana, as Bisrakh village in Greater Noida which is believed to be the birthplace of Ravana's father, Vishrava Rishi lies in this land. In Mahabharata, Dankaur was the Dronacharya's ashram, where Kauravas and Pandavas took their training.

Demographics

According to the 2011 census of India, Gautam Buddha Nagar has a population of 1,648,115. It is ranked 294th out of a total of 640 Indian districts in terms of population.

The female literacy stands at 72.78%, much higher than national average of 65.46%. Scheduled Castes make up 13.11% of the population.

Language

Administration

General administration
The Gautam Buddha Nagar district is headed by a District Magistrate (DM), usually an IAS officer. The district is divided into 3 sub-divisions, each headed by a Sub-Divisional Magistrate (SDM).

Police administration
On 14 January 2020, the Government of Uttar Pradesh declared Gautam Buddha Nagar district as a Police Commissionerate (along with the Lucknow 
district). These two Commissionerates were the first to be created in the state of Uttar Pradesh.

The Gautam Buddha Nagar Commissionerate is headed by a police Commissioner, who is an Inspector-General (IG) rank official, assisted by two Additional Commissioners — one each for law and order, and crime and headquarters —  who are of Deputy Inspector General (DIG) rank. Its first and current Commissioner is Alok Singh, a 1995-batch IPS officer (RR). These top three officials are reported to by seven deputy commissioners of the SP rank, nine additional deputy commissioner of police and 17 assistant commissioners of police of the deputy SP rank.

The district is divided into three zones – Noida, Central Noida and Greater Noida - consisting of 29 police stations. Zone One is Noida, comprising 10 stations of Sector 20, Sector 24, Sector 39, Sector 58, Sector 49, Expressway and Women's police station. Zone Two, Central Noida, comprising parts of Noida, Greater Noida, and Greater Noida West, has nine stations – Phase 2, Phase 3, Bisrakh, Ecotech 3, Surajpur and Badalpur. Zone Three, Greater Noida, has nine police stations — Sector Beta 2, Knowledge Park, Site V, Dadri, Jarcha, Dankaur, Rabupura, Ecotech 1 and Jewar.

As of 14 January 2020, Gautam Buddha Nagar had 3,869 police personnel — 42 inspectors, 459 sub-inspectors, 972 head constables and 2,396 constables.

Politics
Gautam Buddha Nagar district has three assembly seats i.e. Noida, Dadri and Jewar. These 3 assembly seats of GB Nagar district along with Sikandrabad and Khurja assembly seats of Bulandshahr district falls under the Gautam Buddha Nagar Lok Sabha constituency.

Villages 
 

Mahvalipur

Places of interest 
 Buddh International Circuit
 The Great India Place
 Worlds of Wonder
 DLF Mall of India
 Gautam Buddha University
 Rashtriya Dalit Prerna Sthal and Green Garden

References

External links

 

 
Meerut division
Districts of Uttar Pradesh